Pedicularia sicula is a species of sea snail, a marine gastropod mollusk in the family Pediculariidae, one of the families of cowry allies.

Description

Distribution
This species occurs in the East Atlantic, the Azores, Cape Verde, the Canary Islands, Madeira, European waters and the Mediterranean Sea (Sicily).

References

 Calcara P. (1842). Nuove ricerche ed osservazioni sopra vari molluschi Siciliani. Nuove specie di Calyptrea.. Il Maurolico, Giornale del Gabinetto Letterario di Messina 2(3) 
 Nordsieck, F. (1973). Molluschi abissali dello Jonio. La Conchiglia. 57-58: 4-7
 Lorenz F. & Fehse D. (2009) The living Ovulidae. A manual of the families of allied cowries: Ovulidae, Pediculariidae and Eocypraeidae. Hackenheim: Conchbooks.
 Scheltema R. (1971). Larval dispersal as a means of genetic exchange between geographically separated populations of shallow-water benthic marine Gastropods. Biological Bulletin 140: 284-322

External links
 Swainson, W. (1840). A treatise on malacology or shells and shell-fish. London, Longman. viii + 419 pp.
 Philippi, R. A. (1844). Enumeratio molluscorum Siciliae cum viventium tum in tellure tertiaria fossilium, quae in itinere suo observavit. Vol. 2.. Halle 
 Locard, A. (1897-1898). Expéditions scientifiques du Travailleur et du Talisman pendant les années 1880, 1881, 1882 et 1883. Mollusques testacés. Paris, Masson. vol. 1
 Gofas, S.; Luque, Á. A.; Templado, J.; Salas, C. (2017). A national checklist of marine Mollusca in Spanish waters. Scientia Marina. 81(2) : 241-254, and supplementary online material
  Serge GOFAS, Ángel A. LUQUE, Joan Daniel OLIVER,José TEMPLADO & Alberto SERRA (2021) - The Mollusca of Galicia Bank (NE Atlantic Ocean); European Journal of Taxonomy 785: 1–114

Pediculariinae
Gastropods described in 1840
Molluscs of the Atlantic Ocean
Molluscs of the Mediterranean Sea
Molluscs of the Azores
Molluscs of the Canary Islands
Gastropods of Cape Verde
Molluscs of Madeira